The DUFF (teen slang for "Designated Ugly Fat Friend") is a 2015 American high school teen comedy film directed by Ari Sandel. The screenplay by Josh Cagan was based on the 2010 novel of the same name by Kody Keplinger. The film stars Mae Whitman, Robbie Amell, Bella Thorne, Nick Eversman, Skyler Samuels, Bianca Santos, Allison Janney, and Ken Jeong.

The DUFF was distributed by CBS Films via Lionsgate. CBS also produced the film with Vast Entertainment and Wonderland Sound and Vision. It was released on February 20, 2015, and was the first film for which Lionsgate took over CBS Films' distribution functions. It received positive reviews from critics, with Cagan's screenplay and Whitman's and Thorne's performances receiving acclaim. Comparisons were frequently drawn to the cult teen films Mean Girls (2004) and Easy A (2010). Against a budget of $8.5million, the film grossed $43million at the box office.

Plot
Bianca is enjoying her senior year of high school in the suburbs of Atlanta with her two best friends, Jess and Casey, both of whom are significantly more popular than she is. Her neighbor is Wesley, the captain of the football team, who was her childhood friend.

Bianca reluctantly attends a party hosted by mean girl Madison, Wesley's "on-again, off-again" girlfriend with hopes of talking to her guitar-playing crush Toby. At the party, Wesley casually brings to Bianca's awareness that she is the "DUFF" of her friend group—an acronym which stands for Designated Ugly Fat Friend. He explains that the DUFF does not necessarily have to be ugly or fat, it is merely the person in a social group who is less popular, and therefore more accessible, than the others in the group. People exploit the DUFF to get to the popular people. Bianca is insulted and devastated, but she soon realizes Wesley is right: the students in her high school are only interested in her as a way to get to Jess and Casey.

She takes her anger out on Jess and Casey and "unfriends" them on social media and in person. She later overhears Wesley's science teacher Mr. Fillmore telling Wesley that unless he passes the midterm, he is off the football team, which could cost him his football scholarship. Desperate to up her social standing and go on a date with her crush, Bianca strikes a deal with Wesley: she will help him pass his class if he helps her socially. The two have a fun time at the mall, attempting a makeover by buying new clothes.

Secretly, Madison's henchgirl records Bianca embarrassingly  playing around in her new clothes and pretending that a mannequin is Toby. Madison posts the video online to embarrass Bianca because she has become possessive of Wesley and jealous of Bianca's relationship with him. Wesley suggests Bianca just "own" the video and be upfront with Toby, talking directly to him and asking him out. She takes the advice and, to her surprise, he accepts. Bianca takes Wesley to her favorite spot in the forest, her "think rock", to get him away from the constant arguing between his parents, and to help him cope with a possible divorce. They kiss, but joke about it, and pretend it didn't mean anything.

Bianca and Toby have a date at his house, but she finds herself thinking about Wesley and tries to brush it off. By the end of the date, she discovers that Toby has been "DUFFing" her; that is, spending time with her in order to connect with Jess and Casey. She confronts him as the shallow and superficial person he has revealed himself to be, and leaves in tears. While looking for Wesley, to talk with him about the date, she finds him at the thinking rock kissing Madison.

Furious with both boys, Bianca reunites with her girl friends, who were actually genuine all along. They, along with her understanding mother Dottie, convince her to go to the homecoming dance with them in a dress they create together which incorporates elements of her previous wardrobe, such as her plaid flannel shirts. At the dance, Bianca uses Wesley's advice to be upfront, and tells him that she likes him, but he regrettably informs her that he is back with Madison, who approaches the two of them and begins to hurl insults at Bianca.

Bianca delivers her final speech to Madison, finally confronting her and proclaiming that everybody is a DUFF because there is always someone "better", and should be true to their own identity. Additionally, Madison's bullying is just a reflection of her own insecurities about herself. When Madison is crowned homecoming queen and Wesley king, he hesitates before rejecting the title, instead choosing to kiss Bianca in front of the whole school.

Cast

Production

Screenplay and casting 
In November 2011, CBS Films acquired the rights to the novel of the same name by Kody Keplinger. Josh A Cagan was enlisted to adapt the book into a script. He decided to use the Kübler-Ross model of five emotional stages to make a better transition of the narrative part. The script featured on the Black List of best unproduced screenplays of 2011.

Ari Sandel became attached to the project in May 2013. On April 9, 2014, Mae Whitman was cast in the lead; author Kody Keplinger had envisioned Whitman in the role even before the book's release, after watching her on Parenthood. The cast grew with the addition of Bella Thorne on April 30, Ken Jeong on May 12, Skyler Samuels on May 22 Robbie Amell and Bianca A. Santos on May 27, and Allison Janney on June 10.

Filming 
Principal photography began in Atlanta, Georgia, in June 2014 and ended on July 9, 2014. Shooting locations included Henry W. Grady High School, Marietta High School, Perimeter Mall, the Cobb Energy Performing Arts Centre, Stone Mountain Park, and a local Dave and Buster's.

Soundtrack
The official motion picture soundtrack for The DUFF was released digitally on February 17, 2015, by Island Records.

Release
The film was released on February 20, 2015, by CBS Films via Lionsgate. It was then was released on digital HD on May 26, 2015, before the film's DVD and Blu-ray release on June 9, 2015, by Lionsgate Home Entertainment.

The DUFF grossed $34million in the United States and Canada, and $9.7million in other territories, for a worldwide total of $43.5million, against a budget of $8.5million.

In North America, the film debuted at number five in its first weekend, with $10.8million, finishing behind Fifty Shades of Grey, Kingsman: The Secret Service, The SpongeBob Movie: Sponge Out of Water, and McFarland, USA.

Reception
, the film holds an approval rating of 73% based on 120 reviews on Rotten Tomatoes, with an average rating of 6.1/10. The site's critics consensus states: "The DUFF doesn't achieve teen-movie greatness, but offers enough of a postmodern twist on the genre to recommend—and boasts typically great work from star Mae Whitman." On Metacritic, the film has a weighted average score of 56 out of 100 based on 28 reviews , indicating "mixed or average reviews". Audiences surveyed by CinemaScore gave the film a grade "A−" on scale of A to F.

Lindsey Bahr of the Associated Press gave the film a positive review, saying "While it's neither as biting as Mean Girls nor as sweetly referential as Easy A, the earnest and sometimes amusing The DUFF is a fine addition to the canon." Sheri Linden of The Hollywood Reporter gave the film a positive review, saying "Its central pair of unlikely allies will engage young audiences' sympathy. They're smartly played by Mae Whitman and Robbie Amell, whose warmth and comic chops keep the movie buoyant." Kyle Smith of the New York Post gave the film two and a half stars out of four, saying "This winsome comedy is a little low in the stakes department, not to mention predictable, but it gets an "A" for charm." Kevin P. Sullivan of Entertainment Weekly gave the film a B−, saying "The DUFF won't stay with you far past its runtime. But as a vehicle, it's ample proof that we should be seeing more of Mae Whitman." Amy Nicholson of LA Weekly gave the film a C, saying "The DUFF doesn't seem to know what its point actually is. It's pro-self-acceptance and also pro-makeover. It's about liking yourself, and how you'd like yourself better with a boyfriend." Inkoo Kang of TheWrap gave the film a positive review, saying "Mae Whitman reveals herself to be one of the funniest actresses of her generation in a spot-on and endlessly quotable take on teenage 'dramz' in 2015." Michael Phillips of the Chicago Tribune gave the film two out of four stars, saying "You know what would be revolutionary? Making a really good movie about a three-dimensional teenage female character that doesn't start and finish with both eyes on the same old punishing character types."

Ann Hornaday of The Washington Post gave the film zero stars out of four, saying "What might have been a frank portrayal of high school culture and challenges ends up veering between being either too cynically hyper-sexual or preachy." Rafer Guzman of Newsday gave the film three and a half out of four stars, saying "A smart, funny, straight-talking teen movie in the John Hughes tradition. Oodles of charm from the young cast." Claudia Puig of USA Today gave the film two out of four stars, saying "Mae Whitman is the best thing here, and the funny actress deserves better material than what's offered in this derivative and superficial ode to teen self-acceptance." Betsy Sharkey of the Los Angeles Times gave the film a negative review, saying "Romance, or the desire to find someone special, isn't a bad thing—if it's not the only thing. But as it stands in DUFF, the denouement at prom has cliché written all over it." Christy Lemire of RogerEbert.com gave the film three out of four stars, saying "Whitman displays flawless comic timing and consistently makes inspiring choices in terms of delivery, reaction, even the slightest facial expression. She shines confidently in a self-deprecating role, and it's irresistible." Bilge Ebiri of New York magazine gave the film a positive review, saying "Why is it so wonderful? Because wit and charm matter, and The DUFF has a good deal of both. The cast will be stars, the gags will be immortal, and you'll still be watching this movie years from now." David Lewis of the San Francisco Chronicle gave the film three out of four stars, saying, "Sandel's film has heart, some good laughs and a decent message. In this age of cyberbullying, that's nothing to scoff at."

Accolades

References

External links
 
 

2015 films
2015 comedy films
2015 independent films
2010s coming-of-age comedy films
2010s high school films
2010s teen comedy films
American coming-of-age comedy films
American high school films
American independent films
American teen comedy films
CBS Films films
Films based on American novels
Films based on young adult literature
Films about social media
Films directed by Ari Sandel
Films scored by Dominic Lewis
Films set in Georgia (U.S. state)
Films shot in Atlanta
Films shot in Austin, Texas
Lionsgate films
Wonderland Sound and Vision films
2010s English-language films
2010s American films